Jenny Fulle (born in San Francisco, California) is an American woman who, at the age of eleven, became the first girl to play Little League baseball legally in the United States. She is currently a Visual Effects producer in Hollywood with over fifty films to her credit.

Little League

Dear President Nixon 

In 1972, nine-year-old Jenny Fulle tucked her hair up in her cap, pretending to be a boy, and attempted to sign up for Mill Valley Little League in Marin County, California. When asked for her birth certificate, she was quickly rebuffed on the basis of her gender.

The Little League was founded in 1939 and banned girls from playing in 1951.  In 1964, by unanimous decision, the Little League was granted a federal charter by the House and Senate and signed into law by Lyndon Johnson, though girls were still not allowed to play.

In February 1973, at 10 years old, Fulle, who was interested in the position of left field, was again denied the opportunity to join the Bears. This time, she called the American League President, Pete Wolffe, who roundly objected her request. According to Fulle at the time, she also contacted "a lot of ladies"  involved with Little League. "They (the ladies) said they really hoped I’d get somewhere. The men just said no." 

Undeterred, Fulle wrote a letter to the President of the United States, Richard Nixon, in March of that year, stating in her letter that, "Most girls who even want to try out are good enough to at least make minor without any trouble. I sincerely hope you will do something."

Two months later, she received a reply from Frederick T. Cioffi, a HEW official with the Office of Civil Rights. The letter explained that she could have a case if there is a connection between Little League and the use of public school facilities. Cioffi explained that the Office of Civil Rights was "in the process of preparing guidelines to handle this type of discrimination." The guidelines would apply to a Title IX amendment to the 1964 Civil Rights Act.

Lew Mathis, a colleague of Frederick Cioffi's, at the Office of Civil Rights in Washington DC reiterated that with Title IX, "The regulations now being written prohibit sex discrimination in all school activities." He and Cioffi's argument was based in the fact that since many Little League teams were using public school facilities, with this amendment, the teams would be forced to include girls or be disallowed from the property.

According to the national director of public relations for Little League at the time, Robert Stirrat, safety was the reason that girls were not allowed to play in the Little League. He did not believe Jenny's case was sexist, but instead felt that, "all the medical and physiological evidence indicates baseball is a hazardous sport for girls to play on the same team with boys."

Hazardous sport 

"A girl's reaction time to a thrown ball is considerably less than a boy’s. Girls are vulnerable to being hit. Their long bones in their arms and legs are more vulnerable than boys," Stirrat said.

This sentiment was upheld by Dr. Creighton Hale, a research physiologist that was serving as league vice president and director, who believed that anatomically, girls were more likely to be injured, referring to what he considered to be differences in bone length, muscle fiber and reaction time.

"In contact sports it is a hazard," he said. "Our position is not a negative one. We’re very much in favor of girls being on teams – in sports like tennis and swimming," he said. "It’s not fair to the girls to let them play." The solution, according to the Little League was for girls to play softball.

Though Fulle did play softball, she lamented the fact that it was too easy. "I usually hit home runs" she said. "Last year girls were out there picking flowers. How can’t you hit home runs when they’re out there picking flowers?"

Constitutional issue 
At the time there were 8000 Little Leagues scattered around the world with 2½ million boys (but no girls) playing in 31 countries.

Throughout the US, there were several instances where girls had attempted to play in Little League with varying results, all of which representing the discriminatory stance of the organization.

A team in Concord, NC, for instance, was facing suspension from the Babe Ruth League for playing a 13-year-old girl, Yvonne Burch, while another Babe Ruth team in Schenectady, NY, refused to play, Sheila O’Donnell, 17, who apparently was a solid player.

A similar case in Ypsilanti, MI, resulted in the Little League teams breaking their affiliation with the national organization so they could accept a girl into their league.

As a result of so many girls wanting to play in the Little League, Rep. Martha Griffiths (D-Mich) in 1973 introduced a bill to Congress that would substitute the word "boys" in the federal Little League charter with "boys and girls" and drop "manhood" from its objectives of "citizenship, sportsmanship and manhood."  The bill was expected to be reported out of the subcommittee on civil and constitutional rights of the House Judiciary Committee later that summer.

Fighting this fight on several fronts, the National Organization for Women (NOW) had their attorneys researching the law to see if they could open the Little League doors for Fulle. NOW's Marin County president, Lee Hunt pointed out that the teams used a city-owned playground in Mill Valley. She and her attorneys began investigating whether or not it was against the law under the city charter for the baseball teams to use the park if they discriminate on the basis of gender. Hunt said, "We see this as a constitutional issue. We feel the Little League has a discriminatory charter and the city, by allowing them to use public facilities for games, is supporting that policy."

Meanwhile, Stirrat, from the National Little League office in Williamsport, PA, stood his ground that any team that allowed girls to play with boys was "willfully violating" part of its charter. As a result, the team could lose its charter and all the financial perks involved, special insurance and discounts on uniforms and equipment.

The battle begins 

The drive to play Little League Baseball by Fulle and a handful of other Mill Valley girls led the Mill Valley Park and Recreation Commissioner Phyllis Joseph, on Monday, June 11, 1973, to introduce a motion to the commission to bar any organization from city playgrounds "that discriminates on the basis of race, religion, creed or sex." The motion failed by a vote of 3-2, thereby deciding not to order the local Little League teams to let girls play. Upon losing this decision, Fulle and the others vowed to continue their battle at an upcoming city council meeting the following week.

With the assistance of NOW and the American Civil Liberties Union, Fulle took her case to the Mill Valley City Council on June 18, 1973. Before the vote, the female Mayor Barnard, ironically on the side of keeping girls out of Little League, called for a show of hands from the standing-room only crowd, noting that the people were evenly split on the issue.  She also asked Fulle, "Why don’t you want to play baseball with the girls?" Fulle, wearing a T-shirt, pants and baseball hat, said, "Girls are expected to play with dolls. We don’t have that much experience playing baseball. But that doesn’t mean that we can’t. I haven’t played with dolls since I was seven years old."

In the 90 minute hearing, with a 3-2 vote, the council decided to tell the national Little League organization that the League would not be allowed back to Mill Valley the following year unless it ended its ban of girls.

After the vote, Mayor Barnard, on the losing side, expressed her reasoning for not wanting girls to play in the Little League by stating, "I feel there is little difference between the sexes except in muscle power. Viva la difference."

Fulle, a strong hitter and solid left fielder, was pleased with the decision.

Ruling overturned 

The victory, as it turned out, would be short-lived. On Monday December 3, 1973 - pressured by an appeal from the presidents of the two Mill Valley Little Leagues, R. Bruce Williams and Sam Loy - the Mill Valley City Council overturned their previous decision with a unanimous vote, allowing Little League teams to play one more season on city-owned playgrounds without allowing girls to play.

Loy and Williams’ argument was that any change in Little League regulations had to come from the League headquarters in Williamsport, PA. And if they were to come, those changes could not be implemented until the following July.

At the meeting, David Moore, Marin representative to the National Little League Congress stated, "We’re not here to do war with the female sex or the City of Mill Valley. We just want to put 350 boys on the playing field this year."

He also mentioned that the national organization had formed a commission to study the question of safety for girls. The commission planned to report to the national organization at the end of the 1974 season. If in fact the girls were to be included in the charter, it would actually not be until the Spring of 1975 that they would be included in Little League play.

This came as a bitter disappointment to Fulle, who would be 13 in 1975 and not eligible to play in the Little League.

In a letter dated December 13, 1973, ACLU lawyer, Fred Hurvich volunteered to represent Fulle if she decided to take the matter to court.

Getting Jenny on a team 

As a result of continued pressure on the council from the Mill Valley Human Rights Committee, on Monday, April 1, 1974, the Mill Valley City Council voted yet again, this time barring any organization that discriminates on the basis of sex from city facilities.

The vote followed a half hour debate on the subject and meant that the 350 member Little League of Marin County would have no place to play after July 1.

This reversal was small solace for Fulle, who would still not be able to play Little League since the season would be all but over and not have an effect on the concurrent season. At that same meeting, ACLU lawyer, Hurvich, threatened to sue the City of Mill Valley to force out the sex-discrimination clause in Mill Valley's Little League so that girls could play that very summer. Their aim, according to Hurvich was to "get Jenny onto a team this year."

The council maintained its decision to let the local Little League play for one more summer without girls. Even still, Hurvich pleaded with the city to tell Little League they need to allow Jenny to play, or the League would be banned from Mill Valley parks. He promised to fight for the local Little League so that they did not lose their charter. "We are prepared to be in court on a day’s notice if the National Little League acts against them," said Hurvich.

Shortly thereafter, when the National Little League threatened to disenfranchise the Bears if they let Fulle on the team, Hurvich did exactly as he promised and took the matter to court.

Jenny held her own 

On Wednesday, April 10, 1974, Superior Judge Joseph Wilson signed a temporary restraining order that said the Mill Valley Little League baseball team, the Bears, could not bar Jenny Fulle from membership on account of her gender. He also banned the National Little League from releasing Mill Valley from their charter.

After the judgment by Wilson, Mill Valley Little League Commissioner, R. Bruce Williams said, "We wanted to allow Jenny to play, but we feared that without a court order the National Little League would lift our charter."  Wilson's decision solved that problem.

Four hours after the judge issued the restraining order, Fulle showed up at practice for her Little League team, the Bears. The first pitch was a wild one, hitting her in the helmet and dropping her to the ground. She stood up, smiled and went on playing. Of twelve pitches, she hit nine of them beyond the outfielders. In a practice game that followed, she excelled at first base, making three solid plays without error.

At the end of practice that day, Fulle said simply that she was, "really happy."

On Wednesday, June 12, 1974 Little League Baseball, Inc. announced it would open all competition to both boys and girls.

The decision at Little League headquarters stated that girls who want to play Little League baseball must prove to the local team coaches and management that they had "equal competency" with boys "in baseball skills, physical skills and other attributes used as the basis for team selection."

In New York, NOW issued a statement praising Little League for correcting "its discriminatory policy toward girls." The statement went on to say, "NOW chapters and members throughout the country have devoted much effort to enacting this kind of change for equal sports opportunities for girls and women. This victory is an important step."

In the final week of December 1974, President Gerald Ford signed into law a bill that opened the Little League baseball program to girls.

The wording in the League's charter was amended by changing the word "boys" wherever it appeared, to "young people".

In 1975, after Fulle had officially played her first and final season of Little League, the Mill Valley American League President, Robert Williams had this to say about the decision, "It worked out real well last year. It may have been a big thing over nothing…Jenny more than held her own. She was in the upper half of the league when comparing talent."

In 2000 Fulle was invited back to Mill Valley to lead the Little League's opening day parade and throw the first ball in celebration of the city's centennial.

Visual effects producer

Early career 

In 1980, at the age of 18, Fulle began her long and highly successful career in the film industry, starting as a janitor at George Lucas' Industrial Light and Magic.

Her step-father at the time was not only the landscape architect designing at Skywalker Ranch, but was also in charge of general services, including the mailroom and janitorial. Jenny had taken a few classes in college, but had yet to find her niche when her step-father asked her to take over for an injured janitor at ILM. It was to be a temporary job but when her step-father moved on from his position, the person that took over for him liked Fulle enough to keep her on.

Fulle rose up from janitorial services to eventually become a Visual Effects Production Assistant on Star Trek IV: The Voyage Home. She continued her path at ILM unabated, growing into the position of Visual Effects Coordinator on Cocoon: The Return, Back to the Future Part III, Who Framed Roger Rabbit and Ghost.

Producer, executive and Sony Pictures Imageworks 

In the early nineties, Fulle moved to Los Angeles to further pursue her career in visual effects, landing her first Visual Effects Producer credit on Batman Returns. From there she went on to produce for several different films and companies including True Lies for Boss Films in 1994, Apollo 13 for Digital Domain in 1995, Eraser as head of Warner Digital Studios in 1996, and MouseHunt for DreamWorks SKG in 1997, among many others.

After a stint as a Visual Effects Production Executive at Disney, Fulle was tapped to become Executive Vice President/Executive Producer for Sony Pictures Imageworks in late 1997. For the next eleven years Fulle oversaw and managed production, strategic planning and business development at SPI. During this time, in 2004 she was elevated to the position of Executive VP of Production at Imageworks.  Under her leadership, the company grew from 300 employees to over 1200, while developing a first of its kind pipeline that could manage both live action VFX and animation under one roof. At Imageworks, Fulle worked on over thirty films, including What Lies Beneath, Spider-Man 1, 2, and 3, The Lord of the Rings: The Two Towers, The Chronicles of Narnia, The Aviator, I Am Legend, Open Season (2006 film), Surf's Up (film) and many more.

During her time at SPI, Fulle was recognized for her success in the entertainment industry by various trades and organizations. In 2006, Fulle was named in Variety's Women's Impact report for her work overseeing the animated movies Open Season (2006 film), Surf's Up (film), while also running the production department at Imageworks. Then in October of that same year, she was named number 11 of The Hollywood Reporter's the digital 50. Also in 2006, Fulle was nominated for the Los Angeles Business Journal's 2006 Women Making a Difference Awards. And in 2008, the Professional Organization of Women in Entertainment Reaching Up (Power Up) named Fulle as one of its Ten Amazing Women, in which they honor highly successful gay women in the entertainment industry.

Toward the end of her tenure at SPI, Fulle helped spearhead Sony's exploration of the Indian market of visual effects and animation. This ultimately resulted in Imageworks India in 2007; a partnership between FrameFlow, India and Sony, which Fulle served on the board of until she left Sony to pursue the next phase of her career.

Fulle's experience in helping set up Imageworks India sparked for her a new understanding of the visual effects business. It opened her eyes to the fact that quality VFX houses were springing up and thriving all around the world. This knowledge coupled with her deep experience in visual effects production led Fulle to start her company, The Creative-Cartel in 2009.

The Creative-Cartel 

The Creative-Cartel was conceived as a new way of doing business, to get beyond the traditional brick and mortar, overhead-heavy studio production facilities to a leaner, more nimble entity. The concept was to have a core team of asset managers, production coordinators, project managers and digital pipeline wizards that could work with VFX houses from around the world that were specifically chosen for each project. As Fulle put it, "I certainly do have go-to people, but because no two shows are the same, and the requirements of shows vary, I wouldn’t want to have to go to the same person, because it wouldn’t always be the right fit... we go to whoever is best suited for the work."

For The Creative-Cartel's first major project, Priest, Fulle and her team used over a dozen VFX vendors from around the world - England, Australia, the US and Canada. Managing that many VFX houses was a challenge, but Fulle's company succeeded in overseeing all of their work while also serving as a centralized hub for all VFX on the film. Since then, The Creative-Cartel has honed its process, successfully producing visual effects for Ghost Rider: Spirit of Vengeance, Ted, Seth MacFarlane's directorial debut, and the Will Smith, M. Night Shyamalan collaboration, After Earth.

In 2012, The Creative-Cartel was chosen by Sony Pictures Entertainment to be the first company in the world to provide workflow for their new F65 camera for the film "After Earth." Having implemented a unique workflow in the past with both Ghost Rider: Spirit of Vengeance, and Ted, The Creative-Cartel expanded their services on, After Earth so that they could have control of all data from the moment it is shot all the way through to the Digital Intermediate (DI), this included near-set lab, dailies and post-production management of all digital assets.  The Creative-Cartel joined a team of companies supporting the F65 that includes Colorworks, Sony Pictures Entertainment's digital intermediate facility, FilmLight, a color management and color grading developer, and camera supplier Otto Nemenz, post production services provider Technicolor. Their aim is to support productions using the F65 "from the sensor to the screen."

References

External links
 

Visual effects supervisors